Francisco Cati Balderrama (born December 18, 1981, in Mexico City), known as  Francisco Cati, is a professional Mexican football player.

External links
 

1981 births
Living people
Footballers from Mexico City
Dorados de Sinaloa footballers
Atlante F.C. footballers
Club León footballers
Liga MX players
Association footballers not categorized by position
Mexican footballers